Rhys Alexander Enoch (born 16 June 1988) is a Welsh professional golfer who plays on the European Tour, Challenge Tour and the Sunshine Tour. He won the 2018 Cape Town Open and the 2019 D+D Real Slovakia Challenge. In 2019 he narrowly missed out in a playoff to finish second in the Zambia Open.

Professional wins (5)

Sunshine Tour wins (2)

Sunshine Tour playoff record (0–1)

Challenge Tour wins (1)

Jamega Pro Golf Tour wins (1)

Portugal Pro Golf Tour wins (1)

Results in major championships

CUT = missed the half-way cut
"T" = tied for place

Team appearances
Amateur
Jacques Léglise Trophy (representing Great Britain & Ireland): 2006
Eisenhower Trophy (representing Wales): 2008
European Amateur Team Championship (representing Wales): 2007, 2008, 2009, 2010, 2011
Palmer Cup (representing Europe): 2010
Bonallack Trophy (representing Europe): 2012 (winners)

Professional
European Championships (representing Great Britain): 2018

References

External links

 
 
 
 
 

Welsh male golfers
East Tennessee State Buccaneers men's golfers
Sportspeople from Truro
1988 births
Living people